Pithecanthropus Erectus is a 1956 album by jazz composer and bassist Charles Mingus. Mingus noted that this was the first album where he taught arrangements to his musicians by ear in lieu of putting the chords and arrangements in writing.

Music
According to Mingus' liner notes, the title song is a ten-minute tone poem, depicting the rise of man from his hominid roots (Pithecanthropus erectus) to an eventual downfall due to "his own failure to realize the inevitable emancipation of those he sought to enslave, and his greed in attempting to stand on a false security." The song's title refers to the Java Man fossil, which at the time of its discovery was the oldest human fossil ever found.

Reception

The Penguin Guide to Jazz gave it a maximum four-star rating and included it in its “core collection” of essential recordings, describing it as "One of the truly great modern jazz albums". In the same review, "the all-in ensemble work" in parts of the first track, "Pithecanthropus Erectus", is described as being "absolutely crucial to the development of free collective improvisation in the following decade".

Track listing
All tracks composed by Charles Mingus except where noted.

"Pithecanthropus Erectus" – 10:36
"A Foggy Day" – 7:50 (George Gershwin) 
"Profile of Jackie" – 3:11
"Love Chant" – 14:59

Personnel

Musicians
 Charles Mingus – bass
 Jackie McLean – alto saxophone
 J. R. Monterose – tenor saxophone
 Mal Waldron – piano
 Willie Jones – drums

Production
 Tom Dowd – recording engineering
 Hal Lustig – recording engineering

References

1956 albums
Charles Mingus albums
Atlantic Records albums
America Records albums
Albums produced by Nesuhi Ertegun